The Teljoy Cup was an annual fixture between Northern Transvaal and Transvaal rugby unions. The first Teljoy Cup was held on 19 April 1986. The Northern Transvaal took the first trophy when they beat Transvaal 24–15. The last fixture was held in 1992 overall the Northern Transvaal won the trophy 5 times and Transvaal 1.

Results of the Teljoy Cup between Northern Transvaal and Transvaal was

References

Blue Bulls
Golden Lions
Rugby union in South Africa
Rugby union trophies and awards